Sajna Najam (born 22 February 1971) is an Indian dance choreographer who has worked in all the regional film industries. She started her career in 2000 in television and stage events, before working in films. She won the Kerala state award for best choreographer for 2014, film Vikramadithyan directed by Lal Jose. Veteran film actor Prem Nazir is a relative.

Early life
Sajna Najam was born into a Muslim family in Chirayinkeezh, Trivandrum to M A Nazar & Aysha. Her grandfather M A Rasheed constructed his first theatre in 1957 named Kadheeja, which is still considered one of the biggest theatres in Kerala, before moving into film production. His first movie, Koodapirappu marked the debut of Prem Nawas (who is younger brother of perennial Malayalam cinema hero Prem Nazir). The film was also the film career debut of the great poet and lyricist of Malayalam language, Vayalar Ramavarma.  She has a sister, Shameena Althaf who is the mother of actor Sana Althaf.

Career
Sajna started her dancing career in 2000. Starting as a groomer and choreographer for many reality shows, she and her team “Zarinans” made their mark in the television industry. She eventually moved to the Malayalam film industry. Her career  changed when was offered to choreograph for a film by director Lal Jose. She won  Best Choreography in 2014 for Vikramadithyan. In 2020 she worked with Vijay Sethupathi for a Tamil film, Yaadhum Oore Yaavarum Kelir .

Filmography

TV dance shows

 Dance kerala dance- Zee keralam
 Munch Dance Dance - Asianet
 Comedy Super Nite - Flowers TV
 Kuttikalavara - Flowers TV
 Let's Dance - Amrita TV
 Super Star - Amrita TV
 Vanitha Ratnam - Amrita TV
 Super dancer - Amrita TV
D4Dance - Mazhavil Manorama
 Josco Indian Voice - Mazhavil Manorama
 VerutheAlla Bhaarya - Mazhavil Manorama
 Junior idol - Jaihind TV
 Golden talent - Jaihind TV
 Gandharvasangeetham - KairaliTV

References

External links
 

Indian film choreographers
Living people
Artists from Thiruvananthapuram
Indian women choreographers
Indian choreographers
Indian female dancers
1971 births
Dancers from Kerala
Women artists from Kerala
21st-century Indian women artists
21st-century Indian dancers